Mandwa is a village in Nepanagar Tehsil of Burhanpur district in Madhya Pradesh, India.

There is a Mandwa railway station in the village under Bhusawal railway division on Bhusaval - Itarsi line of Central Railway Zone of Indian Railway.

References

Villages in Burhanpur district